The 2011–12 George Washington Colonials men's basketball marked the first team to be coached by Mike Lonergan. Highlights of the season included a 64–48 win over the University of Maryland Eastern Shore Hawks in the season opener, marking the first victory for Lonergan as the coach at GW.
After a 4–1 start the team struggled mightily, finishing 10–21 and 5–11 in the Atlantic 10 conference. The season ended with a first round loss to the Dayton Flyers, by a score of 67–50, in the 2012 Atlantic 10 men's basketball tournament.

Roster

Schedule

References

George Washington
George Washington Colonials men's basketball seasons